Hungatella hathewayi is a Gram-positive, endospore-forming and rod-shaped bacterium from the genus of Hungatella. Hungatella hathewayi can cause infection in Humans in rare cases.

References

Clostridiaceae
Bacteria described in 2002
Bacillota